Harmaline is a fluorescent indole alkaloid from the group of harmala alkaloids and beta-carbolines. It is the partly hydrogenated form of harmine.

Occurrence in nature 
Various plants contain harmaline including Peganum harmala (Syrian rue) as well as the hallucinogenic beverage ayahuasca, which is traditionally brewed using Banisteriopsis caapi.
Present at 3% by dry weight, the harmala alkaloids may be extracted from the
Syrian rue seeds.

Effects 

Harmaline is a central nervous system stimulant and a "reversible inhibitor of MAO-A (RIMA)". This means that the risk of a hypertensive crisis, a dangerous high blood pressure crisis from eating tyramine-rich foods such as cheese, is likely lower with harmaline than with irreversible MAOIs such as phenelzine.

The harmala alkaloids are psychoactive in humans.
Harmaline is shown to act as an acetylcholinesterase inhibitor. Harmaline also stimulates striatal dopamine release in rats at very high dose levels. Since harmaline is a reversible inhibitor of monoamine oxidase A, it could, in theory, induce both serotonin syndrome and hypertensive crises in combination with tyramine, serotonergics, catecholaminergics drugs or prodrugs. Harmaline-containing plants and tryptamine-containing plants are used in ayahuasca brews. The inhibitory effects on monoamine oxidase allows dimethyltryptamine (DMT), the psychoactively prominent chemical in the mixture, to bypass the extensive first-pass metabolism it undergoes upon ingestion, allowing a psychologically active quantity of the chemical to exist in the brain for a perceivable period of time. Harmaline forces the anabolic metabolism of serotonin into N-acetylserotonin (normelatonin), and then to melatonin, the body's principal sleep-regulating hormone and a powerful antioxidant.

United States Patent Number 5591738 describes a method for treating various chemical dependencies via the administration of harmaline and or other beta-carbolines.

A study has reported the antiviral activity of Harmaline against Herpes Simplex Virus 1 and 2 (HSV-1 and HSV-2) by inhibiting immediate early transcription of the virus at noncytotoxic concentration.

Harmaline is known to act as a histamine N-methyltransferase inhibitor. This explains how harmaline elicits its wakefulness-promoting effects.

Legal status

Australia
Harmala alkaloids are considered Schedule 9 prohibited substances under the Poisons Standard (October 2015). A Schedule 9 substance is a substance which may be abused or misused, the manufacture, possession, sale or use of which should be prohibited by law except when required for medical or scientific research, or for analytical, teaching or training purposes with approval of Commonwealth and/or State or Territory Health Authorities.

Canada 

Harmaline and Harmalol are considered Schedule III controlled substances by the Controlled Drugs and Substances Act. Every person found to be in possession of a Schedule III drug is guilty of an indictable offence and liable to imprisonment for a term not exceeding three years; or for a first offence, guilty on summary conviction, to a fine not exceeding one thousand dollars or to imprisonment for a term not exceeding six months, or to both. Every person found to be trafficking a Schedule III drug is guilty of an indictable offence and liable to imprisonment for a term not exceeding ten years, or is guilty on summary conviction (first-time offenders) and liable to imprisonment for a term not exceeding eighteen months.

See also 
Harmalol
Ibogamine
Tetrahydroharmine, a similar harmala alkaloid

References

External links 
 TIHKAL, #13

Reversible inhibitors of MAO-A
Antidepressants
Beta-Carbolines
Tryptamine alkaloids
Entheogens
Monoamine oxidase inhibitors
Acetylcholinesterase inhibitors
Phenol ethers
Oneirogens